Naseby is a village in Northamptonshire, England. 

Naseby may also refer to:

 Battle of Naseby, a decisive 1645 battle of the First English Civil War fought near the village
 Naseby, New Zealand, a small town on the South Island of New Zealand
 Eileen Naseby (born 1943), Australian author

See also
 Naisby, a surname